Derrick Schofield (first ¼ 1928 – 25 August 1999) was an English professional rugby league footballer who played in the 1940s and 1950s.

Background
Derrick Schofield was born in Rochdale, Lancashire, England, and he died aged 71.

Playing career

International honours
Derrick Schofield won caps for England while at Rochdale Hornets in 1952 against Wales, in 1953 against France, and won a cap for Great Britain while at Halifax in 1955 against New Zealand.

Derrick Schofield also represented Great Britain while at Halifax between 1952 and 1956 against France (1 non-Test match).

Challenge Cup Final appearances
Derrick Schofield played right-, i.e. number 12, in Halifax's 4-4 draw with Warrington in the 1954 Challenge Cup Final during the 1953–54 season at Wembley Stadium, London on Saturday 24 April 1954, in front of a crowd of 81,841, and played right- in the 4-8 defeat by Warrington in the 1954 Challenge Cup Final replay during the 1953–54 season at Odsal Stadium, Bradford on Wednesday 5 May 1954, in front of a record crowd of 102,575 or more.

References

External links
(archived by web.archive.org) Death of Rochdale favourite

1928 births
1999 deaths
Castleford Tigers players
Dewsbury Rams players
England national rugby league team players
English rugby league players
Great Britain national rugby league team players
Halifax R.L.F.C. players
Lancashire rugby league team players
Place of birth missing
Rochdale Hornets players
Rugby league players from Rochdale
Rugby league second-rows
Rugby league wingers